Vyacheslav Lavrent'yevich Nagovitsin is a Russian composer born in Magnitogorsk (21 December 1939). He was a student of Dmitri Shostakovich at the Leningrad Conservatory that he graduated in 1966 (postgraduate school, he graduated from the undergraduate school of the Conservatory in 1963). In 1963-1964 he worked in Ulan-Ude Opera and Ballet Theater. In 1966-1970 he was a lecturer at the Mussorgsky Music School in Leningrad. In 1968-1970 he also worked as the Music Director of the Leningrad Comedy Theatre. Since 1970 he became a professor at the Leningrad Conservatory. He orchestrated two unfinished operas of Modest Mussorgsky: Zhenitba and Salammbô. His orchestration of Salammbô was used by Valery Gergiev at the Mérida festival in 1991.

Selected works
 Violin concerto, opus 21 (1970)
 Concerto for Violin and Orchestra
 Sonata for Flute and Piano

References

Sources
 Moshevich, Sofia,  Dmitri Shostakovich - Pianist (McGill-Queen's Press - MQUP, 2004) - 
 Cummings, David, International Who s who in Music and Musicians  Directory page 483 (Routledge, 2000)

External links
 Vyacheslav Nagovitsin

1939 births
Russian composers
Russian male composers
Living people